During World War II, Operation Narcissus was a raid by forty members of the Special Air Service on a lighthouse on the southeast coast of Sicily. The team landed on 10 July 1943 with the mission of capturing the lighthouse and the surrounding high ground.

Despite intelligence reports, the area was deserted, and so the position was no threat to the nearby Operation Husky landings. The troopers withdrew without a shot being fired.

Allied invasion of Sicily
Conflicts in 1943
July 1943 events
Special Air Service
World War II British Commando raids